The 2017–18 season was Ulster's 24th season since the advent of professionalism in rugby union, and Jono Gibbes' only season as head coach. Rory Best was captain. They competed in the inaugural Pro14 (successor competition to the Pro12) and the European Rugby Champions Cup.

After the departure of Neil Doak, Jono Gibbes joined Ulster as head coach, with Dwayne Peel joining him as assistant coach, replacing Allen Clarke, who had left to join the coaching staff at Ospreys. Aaron Dundon joined as scrum coach, with Niall Malone remaining as skills coach.

Out-half Paddy Jackson and centre Stuart Olding were charged with rape and suspended from playing pending trial (both would be acquitted, but have their contracts revoked). Australian out-half Christian Lealiifano was signed on a five-month loan to cover. Rory Best was restored to the captaincy. The IRFU had blocked South African scrum-half Ruan Pienaar extending his contract as part of their restrictions on foreign players, and he left for Montpellier. John Cooney was signed from Connacht to replace him. Other new arrivals were two South Africans, prop Schalk van der Merwe, signed from the Southern Kings, and loose forward Jean Deysel, signed from the Sharks. Back row forward Roger Wilson retired, lock Conor Joyce and centre Mark Best moved to Jersey Reds, hooker Johnny Murphy went to Rotherham Titans, and lock John Donnan, flankers Lorcan Dow and Stephen Mullholand, and prop Ricky Lutton were released.

After a poor run of form, with eighteen tries conceded in four matches over the Christmas period, Director of Rugby Les Kiss left in January, with Gibbes assuming all coaching responsibility of the team for the remainder of the season. Ulster finished third in Pool 1 of the Champions Cup, failing to qualify for the knockout stage. They finished fourth of seven in Conference B of the Pro14, failing to qualify for the playoffs, and having to beat Ospreys in a playoff to qualify for next season's Champions Cup. Gibbes cut short his contract at the end of the season. Former Ireland captain Brian O'Driscoll described the province as "a bit of a basket case", facing "Administration issues, senior players retiring, the well documented court case, now no number 10 to build the team around, no coach next year, struggling for Champions Cup rugby next season."

Academy flanker Nick Timoney had a breakthrough season, making twenty appearances and scoring five tries. John Cooney was Ulster's leading scorer with 225 points; he was the Pro14's top scorer with 175 points, and made the Pro14 Dream Team. Wing Craig Gilroy was the team's leading try scorer with eleven. Lock Alan O'Connor was leading tackler with 226. John Cooney was Ulster's Player of the Year.

This was fullback Charles Piutau's last season with Ulster: he moved to Bristol Bears at the end of the season. Wings Tommy Bowe and Andrew Trimble and flanker Chris Henry retired. Centre Jared Payne also retired as a player, and was appointed defence coach.

Staff

Squad

Senior squad

Players In
  John Cooney from  Connacht
  Schalk van der Merwe from  Southern Kings
  Jean Deysel from  Sharks
  Christian Lealiifano from  Brumbies

Players Out
  Roger Wilson retired
  Conor Joyce to  Jersey Reds
  Mark Best to  Jersey Reds
  Jonny Murphy to  Rotherham Titans
  Ruan Pienaar to  Montpellier
  John Donnan released 
  Lorcan Dow released 
  Ricky Lutton released 
  Stephen Mulholland released

 Internationally capped players in bold
 Irish Provinces are currently limited to four non-Irish eligible (NIE) players and one non-Irish qualified player (NIQ or "Project Player").

Academy squad
Players joining the academy this year were out-half Michael Lowry and centre James Hume, from RBAI's three-time Schools' Cup-winning team; prop Tom O'Toole from Campbell College; lock/back row Matthew Dalton, from BRA, hooker Alexander Clarke (son of former Ulster hooker and assistant coach Allen Clarke), from Ballymena Academy; flanker Joe Dunleavy, from City of Derry R.F.C.; lock John McCusker, from Rainey Old Boys R.F.C.; lock Jack Regan; flanker Greg Jones and prop Eric O'Sullivan. Wing Robert Baloucoune and scrum-half Graham Curtis joined later in the season.

European Rugby Champions Cup

Pro14

Play-off for the 7th Champions Cup place

The South African teams cannot compete in the European Rugby Champions Cup. The top three eligible teams in each conference automatically qualify for following year's Champions Cup. The fourth ranked eligible team in each conference meet in a play-off match with the winner taking the seventh Champions Cup place.

Ulster had home advantage against Ospreys by virtue of finishing with the greater number of points accumulated during the PRO14 regular league (62, as opposed to Ospreys’ 44). The match was played on Sunday 20 May, at the Kingspan Stadium.

End of season awards
John Cooney was the competition's top scorer with 175 points, and was named at scrum-half on the Pro14 Dream Team.

Friendlies

Ulster A

British and Irish Cup

Pool 5

Quarter-final

Home attendance

Ulster Rugby Awards

The Heineken Ulster Rugby Awards ceremony was held at the La Mon Hotel and Country Club, Castlereagh, on 10 May 2018. Winners were:

Ulster Player of the Year: John Cooney (nominees: Nick Timoney, Stuart McCloskey)
Ulster Rugby Personality of the Year: Paul Marshall
Young Player of the Year: Nick Timoney (nominees: Matty Rea, Johnny McPhillips)
Rugby Writers Player of the Year: John Cooney (nominees: Jacob Stockdale, Nick Timoney)
Ulster Rugby Supporters Club Player of the Year: John Cooney (nominees: Rory Best, Jacob Stockdale)
Academy Player of the Year: Nick Timoney (nominees: Tom O'Toole, Angus Curtis)
Ulster A Player of the Year: Tom O'Toole (nominees: Clive Ross, Matthew Agnew)
Community Rugby Champions: Patrick Baird, Malone RFC; Noel Brown, Cooke RFC (nominees: Clem Bassett, Ballynahinch RFC; Liam Foley, Bangor RFC)
Referee of the Year: Chris Busby
Women's Player of the Year: Larissa Muldoon, Railway Union RFC (nominees: Beth Cregan, Cooke RFC; Brittany Hogan, Cooke RFC)
U18 Girls Player of the Year: Bethany McDowell, Malone RFC (nominees: Kelly McCormill, Monaghan RFC; Lucinda Kinghan, Monaghan RFC)
Youth Player of the Year: Conor McMenamin, Letterkenny RFC (nominees: Seif Eldin Abd El Gawad, Carrickfergus RFC; Charlie Clarke, Rainey Old Boys R.F.C.) 
Schools' Player of the Year: Aaron Sexton, Bangor Grammar School (nominees: John McKee, Campbell College; Nathan Doak, Wallace High School) 
Dorrington B Faulkner Award: Mark Orr
Club Player of the Year: Matthew Agnew, Ballymena RFC (nominees: Andrew Morrison, Banbridge RFC; Peter Cromie, Banbridge RFC)
Club of the Year: City of Armagh RFC (nominees: Malone RFC, Grosvenor RFC)
Special Recognition Award: Norman Pollock

Season reviews
Ulster Rugby: Who did what 2017-18, The Front Row Union, 25 June 2018

References

2017-18
2017–18 in Irish rugby union
2017–18 Pro14 by team
2017–18 European Rugby Champions Cup by team